Marion Township is a township in Dade County, in the U.S. state of Missouri.

Marion Township has the name of Francis Marion, an officer in the Revolutionary War.

References

Townships in Missouri
Townships in Dade County, Missouri